Karvel Markeese Anderson (born June 3, 1991) is an American basketball player for Scaligera Verona of the LBA. He is from Elkhart, Indiana. Anderson played two years, from 2010–12, at Glen Oaks Community College then from 2012–14 at the D-I level for the Robert Morris Colonials of the Northeast Conference. Anderson was named Northeast Conference Player of the Year in 2014.

Anderson faced much adversity during his youth in Elkhart, Indiana. After graduating from Elkhart Memorial High School, Anderson spent time at Butler Community College, Lake Michigan College, and Glen Oaks Community College. At Glen Oaks, he averaged 24.9 points per game and shot 48 percent from the field. He was signed by Robert Morris coach Andy Toole, after Toole visited Anderson during a workout.

Professional career
Following the close of his college career in 2014, Anderson signed with Entersport, a top tier professional basketball agency. In August of that same year, Anderson signed with Andrea Costa Imola in Italy's second division.

On August 3, 2020, he has signed with Büyükçekmece Basketbol of the Turkish Basketbol Süper Ligi (BSL).

On July 27, 2021, he has signed with Scaligera Verona in the LBA. On July 13, 2022, he has re-signed with the team for one more season.

References

External links
ACB.com profile
Robert Morris Colonials profile

1991 births
Living people
American expatriate basketball people in France
American expatriate basketball people in Germany
American expatriate basketball people in Italy
American expatriate basketball people in Spain
American men's basketball players
Andrea Costa Imola players
Baloncesto Fuenlabrada players
Basketball players from Indiana
BCM Gravelines players
Büyükçekmece Basketbol players
Eisbären Bremerhaven players
Junior college men's basketball players in the United States
Liga ACB players
People from Elkhart, Indiana
Robert Morris Colonials men's basketball players
Scaligera Basket Verona players
Shooting guards